The Wolf of Snow Hollow is a 2020 American comedy horror film about a small Utah town that is seemingly terrorized by a werewolf. It was written and directed by Jim Cummings who also stars along with Riki Lindhome, Chloe East, Jimmy Tatro, and Robert Forster. The film is dedicated to Forster, as it was the last of his career, completed shortly before his death.

It was released in limited theaters and on VOD in the United States on October 9, 2020 by United Artists Releasing.

Plot

PJ Palfrey and his girlfriend Brianne vacation in Snow Hollow, Utah, where PJ gets into a verbal altercation with two local hunters. At their rental house that night, Brianne hears a growl and is attacked by something while PJ is in the shower. He discovers her mangled body, with a paw print in the snow.

John Marshall, a Snow Hollow deputy sheriff struggling with anger management issues and alcoholism, is called away from an Alcoholics Anonymous meeting to the murder scene. His father, Sheriff Hadley, and fellow officer Julia Robson have discovered Brianne's corpse, with her genitalia and other body parts missing. Sheriff Hadley worries about having another heart attack. News begins to circulate around the town about a possible "wolfman" among them, though John is adamant that the killing was done by a man not a wolf.

A snowboarding instructor is killed next, in a violent struggle in which one of her arms is torn off, followed by her head. When wolf fur is discovered on her body, rumors about a killer werewolf spread, much to John's annoyance. He gets into a physical altercation with a fellow officer who leaks to the press that the killer could be a wolf. Under stress, John begins drinking again.

While John and Julia drive to work the next morning, someone throws a beer bottle at Robson's car. Paranoid tips from all over the community roll in. Townie Liz Fairchild has a strange encounter with a tall man at a diner, which she reports to the police. Hadley is diagnosed with a heart murmur, and John urges him to seek medical treatment. They argue, with John declaring that Hadley should work from home. Hadley refuses to go for treatment. Later that night, Liz and her three-year-old-daughter are killed by the wolfman.

John, growing increasingly agitated and angry, combs through the town's records in order to determine whether or not the killer has had any personal relationships with the victims, and looks up some werewolf lore. After investigating Liz's workplace, they discover that the man Liz had previously encountered at the restaurant called her workplace asking for her. A curfew is imposed and an active watch for the creature is begun. After another cardiac event, Hadley agrees to retire and seek treatment at John's urging.

Jenna sneaks away in the middle of the night to see her boyfriend, and they are attacked in his SUV by the wolfman, wounding Jenna. John answers a neighbor's 911 call and shoots at the creature, but it escapes and kills a sheriff's deputy, stuffing his body in a trash can. When John yells at Jenna for breaking curfew, Jenna shouts that his lack of care is the reason why she is going away to college on a gymnastics scholarship. After visiting Jenna and Hadley in the hospital, John breaks into Jenna's boyfriend's house and attacks him. Meanwhile, Hadley passes away from heart complications at the hospital.

Grieving for his father and frustrated with the case, John is banned from his support group meetings. The body of a man living in a camper outside town is found dead of a heroin overdose and the responding police believe he is the killer due to multiple factors including his height, his odd knife collection, the presence of a pet wolf-dog, and the discovery of a dead body in a woodpile in his backyard which turns out to be that of a missing woman. When the coroner insults John's intelligence and threatens to tell the press about his difficulties in finding the murderer, John deduces that the coroner was responsible for the vandalism of Robson's car, and fires him.

While John is out distributing evidence from the closed case back to its original owners, PJ contacts Robson at the station and tells her that his belongings contained a seam ripper that was not his. Deducing that the ripper is for taxidermy, Robson realizes that Paul Carnury, the town's only taxidermist, must be investigated, just as John stops by Paul's house. Paul seems eager for details of the case, and asks John about his daughter, something he couldn't have known unless he was present when Jenna was attacked. Deducing this as he walks out the door, John returns and asks Paul to stand up to his actual height, revealing himself to be nearly 7 feet tall. He slams the door on John and runs. John breaks into the house, discovering a workstation containing Hannah's head. Paul stabs John in the stomach, showing his strength by lifting him off of the ground. When Paul hears sirens he drops John and flees into the surrounding woods after changing into a homemade wolf costume. John overcomes his stab wound and pursues Paul into the woods. Paul attacks John and is about to kill him, but he is shot and incapacitated by Robson. John gets up and shoots Paul repeatedly in the head before collapsing.

Sometime later, John and Robson are helping Jenna move into her college dorm, and Robson is revealed to be Snow Hollow's new sheriff. John leaves Jenna condoms for protection. As he walks out of the dorm he passes two male students making sexual comments about the gymnasts in the dorm. John stops for a moment, but then just walks away.

Cast

Jim Cummings as  John Marshall
Riki Lindhome as Detective Julia Robson
Chloe East as Jenna Marshall
Jimmy Tatro as PJ Palfrey
Robert Forster as Sheriff Hadley
Will Madden as Paul Carnury

Production
Filming took place in Kamas, Utah in March 2019. Producer Matt Miller had known Robert Forster from a previous project, and sent the script to his agent. Director Jim Cummings said he "expected a polite 'no,'" but Forster chose to take the role because he viewed it as "a dramatic movie about a father-son relationship, and complications of aging and health."

Release
In September 2020, Orion Classics acquired distribution rights to the film.

The film had a limited theatrical release in the United States on October 9, 2020 by United Artists Releasing and on video-on-demand the same day.

Reception

Box office
In its opening weekend the film grossed $91,943 from 112 theaters.

Critical response
The website's critics' consensus reads: "The Wolf of Snow Hollow treads somewhat unsteadily between horror and comedy, but writer-director-star Jim Cummings' unique sensibilities make for an oddly haunting hybrid." On Metacritic, the film has a weighted average score of 67 out of 100 based on 13 critics, indicating "generally favorable reviews".

John DeFore of The Hollywood Reporter gave the film a positive review and wrote, "Satisfying enough as a horror/slasher flick with a black-comedy aftertaste, it has some commercial appeal but doesn't represent a step forward artistically." Brian Tallerico of RogerEbert.com awarded the film three-and-a-half out of four stars and wrote: "The snow-covered setting and bumbling cops, along with Cummings' deadpan sense of humor, have led to comparisons to the Coen brothers and there is a sense of Fargo meets Silver Bullet in some of The Wolf of Snow Hollow, but it’s not like Cummings wears his influences as obviously as some genre filmmakers."

Peter Debruge of Variety wrote: "Wolf actually does that thing we all hope second features won't: It reveals that idiosyncrasies of an unproven director's debut weren't quirks so much as weaknesses — a disappointment for those of us hoping lightning might strike twice for the Thunder Road helmer."

Grant Hermanns of Comingsoon.net gave the film a 9.5 out of 10.  Chuck Bowen of Slant Magazine awarded the film three stars out of four.  Ignatiy Vishnevetsky of The A.V. Club graded the film a B.  Don Kaye of Den of Geek awarded the film two and a half stars out of five.  Vinnie Mancuso of Collider graded the film an A−.  Meagan Navarro of Bloody Disgusting awarded the film three skulls out of five. JimmyO of JoBlo.com gave the film a 9 out of 10.

References

External links

2020 films
2020 comedy horror films
American comedy horror films
Films shot in Utah
Orion Pictures films
American werewolf films
Films directed by Jim Cummings (filmmaker)
2020s English-language films
2020s American films
2020 independent films